Premna thwaitesii, is an 8m high small tree in the family Lamiaceae. It is endemic to Sri Lanka.

References 

thwaitesii
Endemic flora of Sri Lanka
Taxa named by Charles Baron Clarke